Idrisi is a family name in Middle East and South Asia. Idris is a masculine first name. Notable people with the name include:

 Muhammad al-Idrisi, a 12th-century explorer, geographer and writer
 Idris I of Libya, a 20th-century Libyan king

See also
 Idris, a prophet of Islam, named Enoch in Judaism and Christianity
 Idrisid dynasty
 Idris